The Beulah School on 2nd St., NW, in Beulah, North Dakota was built in 1920.  It has also been known as Beulah High School and as Beulah Middle School.  It includes elements of International Style and Prairie School architecture.

It is a work of Frederick W. Keith and Herman M. Leonhard, both architects of Bismarck.

It was listed on the National Register of Historic Places (NRHP) in 1997.

According to its NRHP nomination, the Beulah School is significant architecturally "as the only Prairie School style building in Beulah and for its International style architecture....[and also is significant] in the area of education as an important building associated with the growth and development of Beulah and the need to provide adequate educational opportunities for its residents. Lastly, the rip rapping and terracing present at the school site is...[significant] in the area of landscape architecture as an important Federal relief project for Beulah."

References

School buildings on the National Register of Historic Places in North Dakota
Prairie School architecture in North Dakota
International style architecture in North Dakota
School buildings completed in 1920
Schools in Mercer County, North Dakota
National Register of Historic Places in Mercer County, North Dakota
1920 establishments in North Dakota